Campylobacterota are a phylum of bacteria. All species of this phylum are Gram-negative.

The Campylobacterota consist of few known genera, mainly the curved to spirilloid Wolinella spp., Helicobacter spp., and Campylobacter spp. Most of the known species inhabit the digestive tracts of animals and serve as symbionts (Wolinella spp. in cattle) or pathogens (Helicobacter spp. in the stomach, Campylobacter spp. in the duodenum). Many Campylobacterota are motile with flagella.

Numerous environmental sequences and isolates of Campylobacterota have also been recovered from hydrothermal vents and cold seep habitats. Examples of isolates include Sulfurimonas autotrophica, Sulfurimonas paralvinellae, Sulfurovum lithotrophicum and Nautilia profundicola. A member of the phylum Campylobacterota occurs as an endosymbiont in the large gills of the deepwater sea snail Alviniconcha hessleri.

The Campylobacterota found at deep-sea hydrothermal vents characteristically exhibit chemolithotrophy, meeting their energy needs by oxidizing reduced sulfur, formate, or hydrogen coupled to the reduction of nitrate or oxygen. Autotrophic Campylobacterota use the reverse Krebs cycle to fix carbon dioxide into biomass, a pathway originally thought to be of little environmental significance. The oxygen sensitivity of this pathway is consistent with their microaerophilic or anaerobic niche in these environments, and their likely evolution in the Mesoproterozoic oceans, which are thought to have been sulfidic with low levels of oxygen available from cyanobacterial photosynthesis.

Phylogeny
The currently accepted taxonomy is based on the List of Prokaryotic names with Standing in Nomenclature (LPSN)  and National Center for Biotechnology Information (NCBI)
and the phylogeny is based on 16S rRNA-based LTP release 106 by 'The All-Species Living Tree' Project

Notes:
 Prokaryotes where no pure (axenic) cultures are isolated or available, i.e. not cultivated or can not be sustained in culture for more than a few serial passages

References

External links
 

 
Bacteria phyla